Kayla Swarts (b. 14 May 2003 ) is a South African field hockey player for the South African national team.

Career

Under–21
Swarts made her debut for the 2023 Junior Africa Cup in Ismailia.

National team
Swarts made her debut for the FIH Nations Cup in Valencia.

Personal life
She was living with his mother, Odessa Swarts and Steven Swarts, in Bloemfontein. She brother, Wayde van Niekerk also is a South African track and field sprinter who competes in the 200 and 400 metres.

She attended Eunice High School, studied at the Stellenbosch University.

References

External links

2003 births
Living people
South African female field hockey players
Female field hockey midfielders